Isha Datar (born January 6, 1988) is the executive director of New Harvest and known for her work in cellular agriculture, the production of agricultural products from cell cultures.

Early life and education
Datar was raised in Edmonton, Alberta, Canada. Her mother worked at a dairy farm, where Datar spent much of her childhood growing vegetables alongside her mother. Her mother was also a sculptor and her father was a doctor. After an elementary school field trip to a landfill, she became invested in reducing global waste and the impact of climate change. Datar received a B.S. from the University of Alberta in 2009. During her time as an undergraduate, Datar took a meat science class that challenged her idealistic vision of the sustainability of the animal agriculture industry and introduced her to cellular agriculture. Datar received her M.Biotech from the University of Toronto Mississauga in 2013.

Career
In 2009, Datar published "Possibilities for an in-vitro meat production system" in Innovative Food Science and Emerging Technologies, which detailed the progress of cellular agriculture. The paper was sent to Jason Matheny - founder and then-director of New Harvest - who forwarded the paper to those who were mentioned in it. In 2013 Datar became the CEO at New Harvest. Datar also co-founded Muufri (now Perfect Day) and Clara Foods (now The EVERY Company). In 2021, Robert Downey Jr. funded Datar's work through his 'fast grants' project. Datar has been profiled in media venues including USA Today, the magazine Toronto Life, the Calgary Herald. She has spoken with NPR's Science Friday, The New Republic, Food & Wine magazine, and the National Observer.

Awards and honors
Canadian Business spotlighted her work as a 2016 Change Agent. In 2019, Datar was named one of 25 Food and Agriculture Leaders to Watch by FoodTank.com.

References

External links
, April 27, 2013
Isha Datar: How we could eat real meat without harming animals at TEDMonterey, July 2021

Living people
Canadian women in business
University of Toronto alumni
Biotechnologists
University of Alberta alumni
1988 births